Cookie Allez (born c. 1948) is a French novelist.

Early life
Cookie Allez was born circa 1948.

Career
She has written seven novels.

Her second novel, La Soupière, talked about a mother and her son, who works as a clinical assistant.

In her seventh novel, Dominique, published in 2015, Allez writes about a child whose parents do not tell him if he is a boy or a girl to go along with the theory of gender studies.

Bibliography

Novels
Le Ventre du président (Paris: Éditions Buchet/Chastel, 2001, 121 pages).
La Soupière (Paris, Éditions Buchet/Chastel, 2002, 139 pages).
L’Arbre aux mensonges (Paris, Éditions Buchet/Chastel, 2003, 179 pages).
Le Masque et les Plumes (Paris, Éditions Buchet/Chastel, 2005, 219 pages).
Sans sucres ajoutés (Paris, Éditions Buchet/Chastel, 2006, 193 pages).Mobile de rupture (Paris, Éditions Buchet/Chastel, 2014, 234 pages).Dominique (Paris, Éditions Buchet/Chastel, 2015, 192 pages).

EssaysLes Mots des familles (Paris, Éditions Buchet/Chastel, 2010, 233 pages).200 expressions inventées en famille'' (Paris, Éditions Points, 2011, 203 pages).

References

Living people
21st-century French novelists
Year of birth missing (living people)
French women novelists
21st-century French women